Christopher John Butler (born 12 August 1950) is a British former Conservative Party politician.

Political career
Butler was the unsuccessful Conservative candidate in a 1985 by-election for the Welsh seat of Brecon and Radnor, where the Conservative vote dropped by 20 per cent and the seat was taken by the Liberal Richard Livesey. He later became the Member of Parliament (MP) for Warrington South from 1987 to 1992, when he lost his seat by 191 votes to the Labour Party candidate Mike Hall.

Later life
He is now a partner at Butler Kelly; a cross-party public affairs consultancy.

He stood for the Brexit Party in Cardiff North at the 2019 general election, and came in fifth place.

References

Bibliography
The Times Guide to the House of Commons, Times Newspapers Ltd, 1992

External links 

1950 births
Living people
Conservative Party (UK) MPs for English constituencies
UK MPs 1987–1992
Reform UK politicians
Reform UK parliamentary candidates